The 2013 Clásica de San Sebastián was the 33rd edition of the Clásica de San Sebastián, a single-day cycling race. It was the nineteenth event of the 2013 UCI World Tour season.

The race was won by 's Tony Gallopin, after he made a solo attack on the race's final climb – the Alto de Arkale – and was able to hold off the remainder of the field, to take the biggest win of his career. Second place went to 's Alejandro Valverde, 28 seconds behind Gallopin, while the podium was completed by  rider Roman Kreuziger.

Teams
As the Clásica de San Sebastián was a UCI World Tour event, all 19 UCI ProTeams were invited automatically and obligated to send a squad.  were given a wildcard place to form a 20-team peloton.

The 20 teams that competed in the race were:

Results

References

Clásica de San Sebastián
San Sebastian
Clasica de San Sebastian